Tillandsia adamsii is a species in the genus Tillandsia. This species is native to Jamaica.

Name 
The species is named after English botanist Charles Dennis Adams who authored Flowering Plants of Jamaica and Caribbean Flora.

References 

adamsii
Epiphytes